Lunevshchina may refer to:

Lunevshchina, Gdovsky District, Pskov Oblast, a village in Gdovsky District of Pskov Oblast, Russia
Lunevshchina, Gdov, Pskov Oblast, a village under jurisdiction of the town of Gdov, Pskov Oblast, Russia